Bob Burns (born May 12, 1935) is an American actor, consultant, producer, archivist and historian of props, costumes, and other paraphernalia from science fiction, fantasy, and horror motion pictures. He is best known for his work with and collection of movie props, particularly from horror and science-fiction movies. He has also had numerous smaller acting roles in movies, including Tracy the Gorilla in the 1975 television show The Ghost Busters.

Bob's Basement
Bob's Basement is the informal name given to Burns's collection of props, costumes, and other memorabilia. The New York Times stated that it could be described as the "premier film museum in the Los Angeles area, though it is not open to the public and has no regular hours." Notable contents include the last surviving 18-inch armature model used in the animation sequences of the original 1933 King Kong movie, costumes from several of the Republic Pictures serials of the 1940s (including Roy Barcroft's costume from The Purple Monster Strikes), masks from several different movies made by special make-up effects creator Rick Baker, a 7-time Academy Award winner for makeup, and the original Time Machine prop from the George Pal film of the same name.

Burns was also best friends with AIP special effects technician Paul Blaisdell for many years, and assisted him with the effects on several AIP films, such as Invasion of the Saucer Men (1957). Burns and Blaisdell also co-published a monster magazine together in the early 1960s called Fantastic Monsters of the Films.

The Smithsonian Institution has made several offers to acquire the 1933 King Kong 18-inch armature model, but all of the offers have been refused. One famous director offered Burns half a million dollars for the model and again, Burns turned it down. Burns says that he has no plans of ever selling or donating the prop, as he wishes it to stay in Hollywood.

Burns also has one of the largest private collections of memorabilia from the Alien franchise - a short documentary about his collection was included in the 2003 Alien Quadrilogy DVD collection and the subsequent 2010 Alien Anthology Blu-Ray set.

Beast Wishes
Beast Wishes, by film makers Frank Dietz and Trish Geiger, is described as "a documentary film about a man, a gorilla... and a woman who loves them both!"  It honors the love and passion of Bob Burns, and his energy spent saving the props which made past films come alive, and which would otherwise have been relegated to the dumpster.  Clips of the film were shown at the Monsterpalooza convention in Burbank, California, on April 15, 2012.  The showing was one part of a panel of guests, including Bob and Kathy Burns, in which stories and anecdotes were shared.

Filmography
 Invasion of the Saucer Men (1957)
 Lemon Grove Kids Meet the Monsters (1965)
 Rat Pfink a Boo Boo (1966)
 Superman vs. the Gorilla Gang (1965) .... Kogar the Gorilla
 The Further Adventures of Major Mars (1976)
 The Ghost Busters as "Tracy, The Gorilla" with Forrest Tucker and Larry Storch on the CBS-TV Series 1975 but is credited as the one who "trained" Tracy.
 The Further Adventures of Major Mars (1976) (uncredited) .... Major Mars
 Robot Monster: Special Edition (1982) (TV)
 Drive (1997) .... Doctor/Co-pilot
 Invasion Earth: The Aliens Are Here (1988) .... Muffo - alien character with elephant's trunk
 "Mac Tonight" Character puppeteering for, promotion for McDonald’s television Commercials (1989–1990)
 Forrest J. Ackerman's Amazing Worlds of Science Fiction & Fantasy (1991) (Direct to video) .... Himself
 The Vampire Hunters Club (2001) (Video) .... Bob
 Monster Kid Home Movies (2005) (Video) .... Various Roles ("The Alien", "The Monster")
 The Sky Is Falling: Making 'The War of the Worlds' (2005) (DVD Extra)
 The Naked Monster (2005) .... Admiral Burns/Tracy the Gorilla
 King Kong (2005) .... NY Bystander
 Dark and Stormy Night (2009) .... Kogar the Gorilla
 The Lovely Bones (2009) .... Mall Shopper

Audio commentaries
The Creature Walks Among Us, with film historian Tom Weaver
The Fly II, with director Chris Walas
Frankenstein 1970, with actress Charlotte Austin and film historian Tom Weaver
Godzilla Raids Again, with film historians Steve Ryfle, Ed Godziszewski, and Stuart Galbraith IV
The Mummy, with film historians Rick Baker, Scott Essman, Steven Haberman, and Brent Armstrong
Revenge of the Creature, with actress Lori Nelson and film historian Tom Weaver
The War of the Worlds, with filmmaker Joe Dante and film historian Bill Warren
The White Gorilla, with film historian Tom Weaver
The Bride and the Beast, with actors Charlotte Austin and Slick Slavin and film historian Tom Weaver

References

Further reading

External links

 The Official Bob Burns Website
 

1935 births
Living people
Prop designers
Science fiction fandom
Fantasy fandom
Horror fandom
American film historians
American male non-fiction writers